Johann Philipp von Krusenstjerna (1624–1659) was a German soldier who entered the service of the Swedish Africa Company. He was the second governor of Cape Coast Castle (1655 – 27 January 1658). However, this was not to the liking of Hendrik Carloff, the previous governor appointed by the Swedish Africa Company.

References

1624 births
1659 deaths
17th-century German military personnel